Lewis Edward Armstrong (8 February 1885 – 30 August 1926) was an Australian rules footballer who played with Essendon in the Victorian Football League (VFL).

Armstrong started his career at West Melbourne and in 1906 was a member of their only Victorian Football Association (VFA) premiership. They merged with North Melbourne in 1907 and in 1908 he joined Essendon. Although built like a rover, he often played as a key position forward. He topped their goalkicking in 1911 with 35 goals and played in their premiership that year as well as the following season. During the 1914 season he transferred to back to the VFA where he played for Essendon Association.

References

Essendon Football Club profile

1885 births
Australian rules footballers from Bendigo
Essendon Football Club players
Essendon Football Club Premiership players
Essendon Association Football Club players
West Melbourne Football Club players
1926 deaths
Two-time VFL/AFL Premiership players